Lossatal is a municipality in the Leipzig district in Saxony, Germany, created with effect from 1 January 2012 by the merger of Hohburg and Falkenhain.

Local council

Elections in May 2014:

 CDU: 8 seats
 Bürger Für Lossatal (BFL): 4 seats
 The Left: 3 seats
 Unabhängige Wählervereinigung Falkenhain e. V. (UWV): 1 seat
 SPD: 1 seat
 Freie Wählervereinigung Hohburg e. V. (FWVH): 1 seat

Mayor
Uwe Weigelt was elected mayor in March 2012 with 71% of the votes.

References 

Leipzig (district)